Cvetovo is a village in the municipality of Studeničani, North Macedonia.

History 
During the great migration movements in Macedonia at the end of the 17th and beginning of the 18th centuries, Macedonian Muslims left the Debar area for the central regions of Macedonia and established villages such as Cvetovo located in the Skopje area.

Demographics
Cvetovo has traditionally been inhabited by a Macedonian Muslim (Torbeš) population. The mother tongue of Cvetovo inhabitants and of daily communication is Macedonian.

According to the 2021 census, the village had a total of 809 inhabitants. Ethnic groups in the village include:
Turks 592
Persons for whom data are taken from administrative sources 215
Albanians 1
Others 1

See also 
 Macedonian Muslims (Torbeši)

References

Villages in Studeničani Municipality
Macedonian Muslim villages
Turkish communities in North Macedonia